The 1st U-boat flotilla (German 1. Unterseebootsflottille) also known as the  Weddigen flotilla, was the first operational U-boat unit in Nazi Germany's Kriegsmarine (navy). Founded on 27 September 1935 under the command of Fregattenkapitän Karl Dönitz, it was named in honor of Kapitänleutnant Otto Weddigen. Weddigen, a U-boat commander during World War I, died on 18 March 1915 after his submarine  was rammed by the British battleship  in the North Sea.

Originally based in Kiel from September 1935 – May 1941, it was moved to Brest, France in June 1941. In September 1944, the flotilla was disbanded and its remaining boats were distributed to other flotillas.

Flotilla commanders

U-boats assigned to the flotilla

Notes and references

External links
uboat.net – comprehensive website dedicated to U-boat history.

01
Military units and formations of the Kriegsmarine
Military units and formations established in 1935
Military units and formations disestablished in 1945